Beardown Tors is the 14th highest summit of Dartmoor with a height of .

References
OS OL20 Map 
Beardown Tors-Mountains Britain

Tors of Dartmoor
Dartmoor